The 2022 Danish Individual Speedway Championship was the 2022 edition of the Danish Individual Speedway Championship. The final was held at the Holsted Speedway Center on 20 June 2022. Rasmus Jensen won the title on his home track.

Final 
{| width=100%
|width=50% valign=top|
20 June 2022
 Holsted

References 

Denmark
Speedway in Denmark
2022 in Danish motorsport